Sebald Schnellmann (18 July 1936 – 1983) was a Swiss sprinter. He competed in the men's 200 metres at the 1960 Summer Olympics.

References

1936 births
1983 deaths
Athletes (track and field) at the 1960 Summer Olympics
Swiss male sprinters
Olympic athletes of Switzerland
Place of birth missing